Dixon is a city in northern Solano County, California, United States, located  from the state capital, Sacramento. It has a hot-summer mediterranean climate on the Köppen climate classification scale. Its population was 18,988 at the 2020 census. Other nearby cities include Vacaville, Winters, Davis, Woodland, and Rio Vista.

History

The first semi-permanent European settlement to develop in the Dixon area emerged during the California Gold Rush of the mid-19th century when the community of Silveyville was founded in 1852 by Elijah Silvey as a halfway point between the Pacific coast and the rich gold fields of Sacramento along a route commonly traveled by miners. In 1868, Central Pacific railroad came through the area and missed Silveyville by a few miles. As a result, local leaders decided to physically relocate Silveyville closer to the tracks in order to enjoy the benefits of commerce and travel. One of the first buildings that still stands in Dixon from the 1871 move is the Dixon Methodist Church located at 209 N. Jefferson Street.

Originally, the city was named "Dicksville" after Thomas Dickson who donated 10 acres of his land for the construction of a railroad depot following the completion of the tracks and subsequent relocation of Silveyville to the now-Dixon area. However, when the first rail shipment of merchandise arrived from San Francisco in 1872, it was mistakenly addressed to "Dixon"—a name that has been used since, mainly out of simplicity. Up to now, the urban landscape of the town can be seen to have developed mostly in between the railroad tracks and Interstate-80.

As of 2022 the Dixon city council consists of Steve Bird, Mayor, Scott Pederson, Vice Mayor, representing District 1, Jim Ernest, representing District 2, Kevin Johnson, representing District 3, and Don Hendershot, representing District 4.

The city operates a municipal police and fire department, and water system & wastewater treatment plant.

Geography

Dixon is located at  (38.449108, -121.826872).

Demographics

2010

The 2010 United States Census reported that Dixon had a population of 18,351. The racial makeup of Dixon was 13,023 (71.0%) White, 562 (3.1%) African American, 184 (1.0%) Native American, 671 (3.7%) Asian, 58 (0.3%) Pacific Islander, 2,838 (15.5%) from other races, and 1,015 (5.5%) from two or more races. Hispanic or Latino of any race were 7,426 persons (40.5%).

The Census reported that 100% of the population lived in households.

There were 5,856 households, out of which 2,773 (47.4%) had children under the age of 18 living in them, 3,550 (60.6%) were opposite-sex married couples living together, 790 (13.5%) had a female householder with no husband present, 339 (5.8%) had a male householder with no wife present.  There were 327 (5.6%) unmarried opposite-sex partnerships, and 26 (0.4%) same-sex married couples or partnerships. 867 households (14.8%) were made up of individuals, and 301 (5.1%) had someone living alone who was 65 years of age or older. The average household size was 3.13.  There were 4,679 families (79.9% of all households); the average family size was 3.47.

The population was spread out, with 5,349 people (29.1%) under the age of 18, 1,816 people (9.9%) aged 18 to 24, 5,026 people (27.4%) aged 25 to 44, 4,608 people (25.1%) aged 45 to 64, and 1,552 people (8.5%) who were 65 years of age or older.  The median age was 33.3 years. For every 100 females, there were 97.8 males.  For every 100 females age 18 and over, there were 94.8 males.

The homeowner vacancy rate was 2.0%; the rental vacancy rate was 5.2%.  12,149 people (66.2% of the population) lived in owner-occupied housing units and 6,201 people (33.8%) lived in rental housing units.

2000

As of the census of 2000, there were 16,103 people, 5,073 households, and 4,164 families residing in the city. The racial makeup of the city was 70.51% White, 1.93% Black or African American, 0.99% Native American, 3.11% Asian, 0.30% Pacific Islander, 17.87% from other races, and 5.29% from two or more races. 33.62% of the population were Hispanic or Latino of any race.

There were 5,073 households, out of which 47.8% had children under the age of 18 living with them, 67.0% were married couples living together, 9.7% had a female householder with no husband present, and 17.9% were non-families. 13.0% of all households were made up of individuals, and 4.5% had someone living alone who was 65 years of age or older. The average household size was 3.17 and the average family size was 3.45.

In the city, the population is concentrated among adults 25 to 44 (32.2%) and children under age 18 (32%). Only 8.5% of the population is aged 18 to 24; 20.0% from 45 to 64; and 7.2% who were 65 years of age or older. The median age was 32 years. For every 100 females, there were 100.3 males. For every 100 females age 18 and over, there were 97.8 males.

The median income for a household in the city was $54,472, and the median income for a family was $58,849. Males had a median income of $42,286 versus $30,378 for females. The per capita income for the city was $20,139. About 5.2% of families and 8.1% of the population were below the poverty line, including 9.1% of those under age 18 and 6.6% of those age 65 or over.

Notable sites

The Jackson Fay Brown House and the Dixon Carnegie library are on the National Register of Historic Places.

, Dixon residents Matt and Mark Cooley, owners of Cool Patch Pumpkins, hold the Guinness World Record for "largest maze, temporary corn/crop maze". The maze measured 163,853.83 m2 or 40.489 acres. In 2012, Cool Patch Pumpkins broke its own record with a 53-acre maze. In 2014 Cool Patch Pumpkins again broke its own record by growing a 60-acre maze.

A Milk Farm Restaurant sign, measuring 100 feet tall, was built in May 1963 and still stands today at the intersection of State Route 113 and Interstate 80.

Dixon is home to the Dixon May Fair, California's oldest fair. The fair began in 1885 as a May Day celebration and predates the Solano County Fair which first occurred in 1949. A stage on the fairground was named in honor of country singer Jon Pardi, who grew up in Dixon.

Notable people
 Spencer Webb - University of Oregon Ducks Football - Tight End
 Jon Pardi - Country music singer and songwriter
 Nick Watney - Professional golfer
 Dave Ball - Professional NFL player
 Espinoza Paz -  Latin Grammy-nominated Mexican musician and composer of Mexican regional music
 Joe Craven -  Professional musician and music educator

Transportation

Interstate 80 and California State Route 113 pass through Dixon.

The Union Pacific Railroad mainline between Oakland and Sacramento also passes through Dixon. This line was owned by Southern Pacific Railroad until its merger with Union Pacific on September 11, 1996. The track was constructed in 1868 by the California Pacific Railroad.

Amtrak Capitol Corridor also passes through Dixon over the UP mainline but the nearest station stops are at Davis and Fairfield–Vacaville. Amtrak's California Zephyr and Coast Starlight also pass through Dixon without stopping.

In 2006, the City of Dixon finished construction on a train station near downtown Dixon.  However, there are currently no scheduled stops at the station. The building has, for the time being, been converted to the city's Chamber of Commerce.

The town has public transit in Dixon Readi-Ride a dial-a-ride shuttlebus service. Dixon Park & Ride is a bus station in Dixon. It is served by Fairfield and Suisun Transit route 30 that runs between Fairfield Transportation Center and downtown Sacramento. Dixon Readi-Ride a dial-a-ride service also stops here. It has 89 parking spots. The bus service lasts approximately 10 hours per day on route 30.

Economy

Top employers

According to the city's 2019 Comprehensive Annual Financial Report, the top employers in the city are:

Dixon was the home of the Gymboree Corporation's only distribution center prior to the bankruptcy and closing of the company in 2019.

Media
The Dixon Independent Voice was founded in 1993 (first as The Dixon Newspaper) and is the main paper of circulation today. It is published weekly and is owned by Messenger Publishing Group. The Dixon Tribune newspaper was founded November 14, 1874. Today it is published thrice a week and owned by Gibson Radio and Publishing.  

Historically, the Voice of America ran a shortwave transmitter site that was formerly owned and operated by NBC. NBC built the site in 1944, and it broadcast under the call signs KNBA, KNBH, KNBI, KNBC, and KNBX. The station was closed between September 2, 1979, and October 1, 1983, and briefly reopened for Spanish language broadcasting until 1988. The station served as a relay to both NBC International programming overseas, and as a relay of KNBR and its programming overseas, mostly the Pacific area. There is also a military transmission site, the Dixon Naval Radio Transmitter Facility.

Education

Dixon is served by the Dixon Unified School District, and also has a few private educational institutions. 

High schools
 Dixon High School 
 Maine Prairie High School (continuation school)

Middle schools
Dixon Montessori Charter School
John Knight Middle School (formerly known as C.A. Jacobs Middle School)
Neighborhood Christian Middle School

Elementary schools
Silveyville (closed as of 2008)
Anderson
Gretchen Higgins
Tremont
Neighborhood Christian School
Dixon Montessori Charter School (now located in Silveyville facility)
Easter Seals Special Education Center (shares Silveyville facility with DMCS)

References

External links

 
 

 
1878 establishments in California
Cities in Solano County, California
Cities in the San Francisco Bay Area
Incorporated cities and towns in California
Populated places established in 1878